Sannikov Land was a phantom island in the Arctic Ocean. Its supposed existence became something of a myth in 19th-century Russia.

History

Yakov Sannikov and Matvei Gedenschtrom claimed to have seen the land mass during their 1809–1810 cartographic expedition to the New Siberian Islands. Sannikov was the first one to report the sighting of a "new land" north of Kotelny Island in 1811 (hence the name Sannikov Land).

In 1886, the Baltic German explorer in Russian service, Baron Eduard von Toll, reported observing the elusive land during an expedition to the New Siberian Islands. In August 1901, during the Russian Polar Expedition, also led by Toll, the Russian Arctic ship Zarya headed across the Laptev Sea, searching for the legendary Sannikov Land. It was soon blocked by floating pack ice in the New Siberian Islands. Attempts to reach Sannikov Land, deemed to be beyond the De Long Islands, continued in 1902 while the Zarya was trapped in fast ice. In November, Toll and three companions left the Zarya and travelled south on loose ice floes, away from Bennett Island, and vanished forever.

A search by the Soviet icebreaker Sadko was announced in 1936 and carried out in 1937 but found no trace of the land.

Some historians and geographers, judging from other successes of Sannikov and the presence of shallow sand shoals at Sannikov Land's mapped location, postulate that it indeed once existed, but was destroyed by coastal erosion and became a submerged sand shoal, like many other islands formed either of fossilized ice or of permafrost. This process of Arctic islands disappearing continues within the New Siberian Islands archipelago. Other historians and geographers hypothesize that Sannikov Land might have been a miraged image of Bennett Island. Such mirages occur frequently in the Arctic region.

In popular culture

Russian geologist and science fiction writer Vladimir Obruchev fictionalized this phantom island in his novel Sannikov Land (1926). In the story, the island provided the last escape for a tribe of Onkilon (this was one of the older names for Yuit), pushed away from the mainland by other Siberian peoples. The (fictional) Onkilon were thought to be extinct, and were discovered by a small expedition looking for the island and eventually stranded at it.

Obruchev provided a reasonable justification of the possibility of the described things and events. The island turned out to be a crater of a volcano and a warm place, heated by the volcano. It also hosted a tribe of Neanderthals (called "Vampoo") and mammoths. In the end of the story the volcano erupts and destroys the land.

In 1973, a science fiction film based on Obruchev's book, called The Land of Sannikov, was released in the Soviet Union.

Sannikov Land is used as a location in British horror podcast The Magnus Archives in Episode 101, "Another Twist". It is described as a place that does not exist and has never existed, in association with an entity known as "The Spiral," which personifies madness and deceit.

See also
Crocker Land
Bradley Land
List of mythological places

References

External links

1906 German map showing Sannikov Land north of Kessel (Kotelny) Island
19th century Russian map showing Sannikov land as a white area between 110E and 120E

New Siberian Islands
Phantom Arctic islands